Villy-le-Bouveret is a commune in the Haute-Savoie department in the Auvergne-Rhône-Alpes region in south-eastern France.

Town partnerships

Since 1984, Villy-le-Bouveret fosters an official partnership with Gutenberg, in the Bad Kreuznach district, Rhineland-Palatinate, Germany. Meetings take place every two years with the venue alternating between Gutenberg and Villy.

See also
Communes of the Haute-Savoie department

References

Communes of Haute-Savoie